Danilo Fernando Bueno de Almeida (born 8 June 1979), known as just Danilo Fernando,is a Brazilian former footballer.

References

External links
 

1979 births
Living people
Brazilian footballers
Brazilian expatriate footballers
Expatriate footballers in Indonesia
Footballers from Rio de Janeiro (city)
Borneo F.C. players
Association football midfielders
Clube Atlético Joseense players